Elisha Baxter (September 1, 1827May 31, 1899) was an American businessman and politician who served as the 10th governor of Arkansas from 1873 to 1874.

Early life and career
Baxter was born in Forest City, North Carolina. He sought and obtained an appointment to the United States Military Academy at West Point. Baxter's father, William, strongly opposed his appointment, and Baxter resigned it. He returned home and became a businessman. He ran a successful mercantile business in Rutherford County with his brother-in-law Spenser Eaves.

In 1852, Baxter moved to Batesville, Arkansas, and opened a mercantile business with his brother, Taylor. It soon failed. Baxter joined the Whig party and was elected mayor of Batesville in 1853.  One year later he was elected as state representative from Independence County to the tenth general assembly.  He studied law and, in 1856, was admitted to the Arkansas bar. He was reelected to the House in 1858 and served two terms from Independence County, leaving in 1860.

American Civil War
At the start of the American Civil War, Baxter refused to fight for the Confederacy and attempted to flee to Missouri. He was captured and tried for treason. He escaped north and joined the 4th Arkansas Mounted Infantry (Union), serving as colonel of the regiment. In 1864, after Arkansas was occupied by Union troops, Baxter was appointed as Chief Justice of the Arkansas Supreme Court. He and William Meade Fishback were chosen by the new legislature in May 1864 as the two U.S. senators from Arkansas, but in February 1865, their admission was denied by congressional Republicans displeased with Lincoln for trying to restore Southern representation in Congress so easily. In mid-1865, Baxter formed a law partnership in Little Rock with future U.S. Congressman and fellow Unionist James M. Hinds.

Reconstruction era
In 1868 the Reconstruction-era state legislature elected him and Andrew Hunter to the US Senate, but his appointment was blocked once again by Congress because of the southern states' refusal to extend the franchise to freedmen. From 1868 to 1872, Baxter served as a judge on the 3rd Circuit Court.

In 1872, Baxter was elected as a Republican Governor of Arkansas over Joseph Brooks in a controversial election that resulted in the Brooks-Baxter War. Baxter was physically removed from the governor's office by Brooks and state militia loyal to him. Baxter was not restored to the governorship until a month later.

During his term, state delegates passed a new constitution that shortened the term of the governor and restored the franchise to ex-Confederates. Baxter declined to accept the 1874 nomination for governor. Due to the disenfranchisement of most blacks in the 1890s, the Republican Party was reduced in Arkansas. Democrats established a one-party state that survived into the 1960s. Baxter was the last Republican governor to be elected in Arkansas until Winthrop Rockefeller in 1967, after the Republican Party began a revival there.

Later life and legacy
After leaving office, Baxter returned to his farm near Batesville. He ran for a position in the Arkansas House of Representatives in 1878 but was unsuccessful. He died in Batesville, Arkansas and is buried at Oaklawn Cemetery there. Baxter County was named after him.

Personal life
In 1849 Baxter married Harriet Patton, also from Rutherford County, and together they had six children: Milliard P., Edward A., Catherine M., George E., Hattie O., and Fannie E.  Baxter was a brother of federal judge John Baxter, and an uncle of Wyoming territorial governor George W. Baxter.

References

External links
 
 Elisha Baxter at the National Governors Association
 Elisha Baxter at The Political Graveyard
 
 

1827 births
1899 deaths
19th-century American businesspeople
19th-century American judges
19th-century American politicians
Arkansas lawyers
Chief Justices of the Arkansas Supreme Court
Republican Party governors of Arkansas
Leaders ousted by a coup
Republican Party members of the Arkansas House of Representatives
People of Arkansas in the American Civil War
People of the Brooks–Baxter War
Southern Unionists in the American Civil War
Union Army officers